Novoamvrosiivske is an urban-type settlement in Amvrosiivka Raion (district) in Donetsk Oblast of eastern Ukraine. Population:

Demographics
Native language as of the Ukrainian Census of 2001:
 Ukrainian 29.41%
 Russian 70.13%
 Belarusian and Moldovan (Romanian) 0.12%

References

Urban-type settlements in Donetsk Raion